Satanic Blood Angel is the first compilation album by American black metal band Von. It features the Satanic Blood demo released in 1992, the unreleased Blood Angel demo and a live recording of a gig played in their home city, San Francisco, California. The compilation was released in 2003 by Nuclear War Now! Productions as a double CD and by From Beyond Productions as a single CD. Besides the Satanic, Blood Angel and Satanic Blood demos, Satanic Blood Angel is the only current licensed re-release of the Von demos compiled for sale, excluding Satanic.

Track listing
CD 1 (tracks 1–8: Satanic Blood; tracks 9–14: Blood Angel)
"Devil Pig" – 2:23
"Veinen" – 2:26
"Watain" – 2:49
"Lamb" – 1:41
"Veadtuck" – 3:17
"Satanic Blood" – 2:05
"Christ Fire" – 2:56
"Von" – 2:25
"Evisc" – 1:56
"Release" – 1:18
"Blood Angel" – 1:27
"Chalice of Blood" – 4:06
"Vennt" – 2:16
"Backskin" – 3:21

CD 2 (live in San Francisco)
"Veinen" – 2:27
"Watain" – 3:02
"Lamb" – 1:34
"Evisc" – 1:59
"Release" – 1:20
"Satanic Blood" – 2:18
"Veadtuck" – 3:11
"Chalice of Blood" – 4:12
"Goat Christ" – 1:42
"Vennt" – 2:11
"Dissection Inhuman" – 2:27
"Von" – 2:58

Personnel
Goat – vocals, guitar, cover art
Kill – bass
Snake – drums

References

2003 compilation albums
Black metal compilation albums
Von (band) albums